Illusive Tracks is a Swedish dark comedy thriller film which was released to cinemas in Sweden on 25 December 2003, directed by Peter Dalle, starring Peter Dalle, Gustaf Hammarsten, Robert Gustafsson, Gösta Ekman, Lars Amble and others.

The time is right after World War II, before Christmas of 1945. The story revolves around the passengers on a train heading from Stockholm non-stop to Berlin, and includes murder, adultery, religion, Santa Claus and a very angry train conductor.

The film is in black and white to give it a more dramatic atmosphere. All of the scenes depicting Stockholm Central Station were filmed at the Krylbo railway station to resemblance the 1940s look of Stockholm.

Cast
Gustaf Hammarsten as Gunnar 
Magnus Roosmann as Henry 
Anna Björk as Marie 
Kristina Törnqvist as Karin 
Robert Gustafsson as The Soldier 
Peter Dalle as The Conductor 
Lena Nyman as Märit 
Gösta Ekman as Pompe 
Lars Amble as Sixten 
Jakob Stefansson as The Waiter 
Claes Ljungmark as The Bartender 
Lakke Magnusson as The Head Waiter 
Marie Göranzon as The Nun
Hanna Ekman as Young Nun 
Ella Bjurling as Girl in White Cape

See also
 List of Christmas films

References

External links

2003 films
Swedish comedy films
2000s thriller films
Swedish black-and-white films
Films set on trains
Films set in 1945
Swedish Christmas films
2000s Christmas films
2000s Swedish films